Elise Chabbey (born 24 April 1993 in Geneva) is a Swiss road racing cyclist, who currently rides for UCI Women's WorldTeam . At the 2012 Summer Olympics she competed as a slalom canoer in the K-1 event, finishing 20th in the heats, failing to qualify for the semifinals.

Major results
2020 
 2nd  Team relay, UEC European Road Championships
2021
 1st Stage 1 Tour de Suisse
 3rd Overall Challenge by La Vuelta
 9th Overall The Women's Tour
1st  Mountains classification
2022
 UCI Road World Championships
1st  Team relay
7th Road race
 3rd Dwars door Vlaanderen
 4th Paris–Roubaix
 6th Strade Bianche
 7th Overall Setmana Ciclista Valenciana
 7th Trofeo Alfredo Binda

References

External links
Sports-Reference.com profile

Swiss female canoeists
Swiss female cyclists
1993 births
Living people
Olympic canoeists of Switzerland
Canoeists at the 2012 Summer Olympics
Cyclists from Geneva
UCI Road World Champions (women)
21st-century Swiss women